Chalti Ka Naam Gaadi is a 1 January 1958 Indian musical comedy film directed by Satyen Bose. Starring Madhubala with the Ganguly brothers —Ashok Kumar, Anoop Kumar, and Kishore Kumar— the film revolves around a middle-aged man who resents women due to some misunderstandings and forbids his younger brothers from marrying.

Expected by Kishore Kumar to flop, Chalti Ka Naam Gaadi opened to major commercial success, eventually becoming the most successful work of Bose and Ganguly brothers, as well as Madhubala's fourth consecutive major hit of 1958, thus solidifying her position as the top female star of late 1950s and early 1960s.

Chalti Ka Naam Gaadi has received overwhelming positive reviews from critics for its comical situations, soundtrack, execution and performances. Over years, the film has gained classic status and has also inspired several films including Badhti Ka Naam Dadhi (1974), Saade Maade Teen (2006) and Dilwale (2015). It was ranked #18 in 2003 Outlook Magazine poll of 25 leading Indian Directors for “Best Bollywood Movies of all time”.

Plot 
Brothers Brijmohan, Manmohan and Jagmohan Sharma run a garage. Brijmohan hates women and does not allow any women or pictures of them in his garage unless it is an emergency. One day, while Manmohan is on the night shift, a woman named Renu comes to the garage seeking help as her car breaks down. Renu gets angry at Manmohan because he is sleeping when he is supposed to be on duty. Manmohan does not like the fact that Renu shouted at him and initially refuses to repair her car, but finally agrees. Manmohan fixes the car, and Renu leaves, forgetting to pay Manmohan for his services. He tells his brother Brijmohan about this and realizes that Renu forgot her purse in the garage. Manmohan goes through it and finds a pass to a concert. Manmohan goes to this concert to recover his money. When Manmohan reaches the venue, he is not allowed to enter as the pass has Renu's name on it. Not wanting to let go of his money, Manmohan waits in Renu's car to meet her when she comes out. He, however, falls asleep and Renu does not notice him; she drives home and parks in her garage with Manmohan in the car. When Manmohan wakes up, he gets hungry and looks for some food in Renu's garage. A servant in the house sees this and chases Manmohan, who manages to escape. On his way home, he notices a few men dumping a corpse on the road and fleeing. When he tells his brothers about his night the next morning, they have a hearty laugh at his expense.

Later, Renu calls the garage asking for help with her car and assuring she will pay back her fees. Manmohan refuses to go to her house, fearing that he will be recognized by Renu's servant and will get into trouble; Jagmohan decides to go. Jagmohan meets Sheela in Renu's house and the two start talking. Jagmohan is, however, afraid of women. He gets nervous because Sheela is around and cannot repair the car. After Jagmohan takes off (not before drinking 10 glasses of water due to anxiety), Renu decides to call Manmohan. Meanwhile, Renu's father is approached by Raja Hardayal Singh, who wants to get his younger brother married to Renu. Renu's father decides to talk to Renu about this, not knowing that Raja Hardayal and his brother are crooks – Manmohan saw Raja Hardayal's brother dump the corpse.

As Renu is falling for Manmohan and the crooks desperately want her inheritance, Renu and Manmohan are captured by Hardayal's men. In captivity, they meet Kamini, the woman whose photo Renu had found in Brijmohan's room. Brijmohan and Kamini were in love, but she was married off to Raja Hardayal. Brijmohan is under the impression that she dumped him for a richer man; as a result, he decides that he never wants to associate with women again. Kamini tries to free Renu and Manmohan, but a guard enters. Kamini, however, is able to escape and goes looking for Brijmohan. Meanwhile, Raja Hardyal Singh captures Renu's father and forces him to get Renu married to his brother, threatening to kill Manmohan if he doesn't. Before Raja Hardayal Singh has his way, Brijmohan is brought to the scene by Kamini. Brijmohan, who is a boxing champion, fights Raja Hardyal Singh's men with the help of his two brothers. In the end, Brijmohan and his brothers are victorious. Manmohan and Renu decide to get married. So do Brijmohan and Kamini, and Jagmohan and Sheila.

Cast 
 Ashok Kumar as Brijmohan Sharma
 Madhubala as Renu
 Anoop Kumar as Jagmohan "Jagu" Sharma
 Kishore Kumar as Manmohan "Manu" Sharma
 Sahira as Sheela
 Veena as Kamini
 K.N. Singh as Raja Hardayal Singh
 Mohan Choti as Maujiya
 Sajjan as Prakashchand
 Helen as Dancer
 Cuckoo as Dancer
 Minhaj Ansari as Dancer
 Asit Sen as Lalchand (dead man)
 S N Bannerjee as Renu's father

Production 

On the sets of Chalti Ka Naam Gaadi, Madhubala rekindled a friendship with Kishore Kumar, who was her childhood playmate and also her friend Ruma Guha Thakurta's ex-husband. Following a two-year-long courtship, Madhubala married Kishore in court on 16 October 1960.

Kishore Kumar made Chalti Ka Naam Gaadi, hoping it would fail commercially; he wanted to show losses in his income, and thus avoid paying a huge income tax to the authorities. To his disgust, the film became a success; as he did not want to add to his earnings, he gave Chalti Ka Naam Gaadi and all its rights to his secretary Anoop Sharma, who retained the copyright. The income tax case on Kishore Kumar was not solved even after forty years.

Soundtrack 

The music is composed by S. D. Burman with Jaidev and his son, R. D. Burman as the assistant music composers, and lyrics by Majrooh Sultanpuri. The songs "Hum The Woh Thi" and "Ek Ladki Bheegi Bhaagi Si" were based on Tennessee Ernie Ford's "The Watermelon Song" and Merle Travis's "Sixteen Tons" respectively.

The soundtrack was popular with audience, and was placed at #51 in Film Companion's list "Top 100 Bollywood albums".

The song  "Ek Ladki Bheegi Bhaagi Si" was listed among the Top 25 Rain Songs of Bollywood by Rediff.

Reception

Box office 
Chalti Ka Naam Gaadi, the second highest-grossing Indian film of 1958, grossed ₹2.5 crore, including a nett of ₹1.25 crore at the box office. Adjusted for inflation, its gross was equivalent to about ₹485 crore in 2016, and it remains one of the highest-grossing Indian films in the history (when adjusted for inflation).

Critical reception 
Chalti Ka Naam Gaadi has received overwhelming positive reviews by modern-day critics. Author Dinesh Raheja, writing for Rediff.com, said that "if the best screwball comedies are those that continue to connect even with the modern generation, this fifties jest-setter is a sureshot winner." He also commented favourably on Madhubala and Kishore Kumar's chemistry, adding that Chalti Ka Naam Gaadi was the finest of the five films they made together.

Sandipan Deb of Mint called it "best Hindi movie ever made", noting its treatment of female characters:

Remakes 

 Saade Maade Teen (2007), Marathi film 
 Dilwale (2015)

See also 

 Hulchul (2004) film

References

Bibliography

External links 
 
  Chalti Ka Naam Gaadi on YouTube
1958 films
1950s Hindi-language films
Films scored by S. D. Burman
Indian comedy films
Hindi films remade in other languages
Films directed by Satyen Bose
Indian films with live action and animation
1958 comedy films
Hindi-language comedy films 
Films about siblings 
Films about brothers